There She Goes may refer to:
 There She Goes (TV series), a British television series
 "There She Goes" (Babyface song), 2001
 "There She Goes" (Taio Cruz song), 2012
 "There She Goes" (Daughtry song)
 "There She Goes" (The La's song), 1988
 "There She Goes", a 1981 song by Kevin Coyne from Pointing the Finger
 "There She Goes", a 1955 song by Carl Smith

See also
 "There She Go" (PnB Rock song) (2017)
 "There She Go" (Fetty Wap song) (2017)
 "There She Goes Again", a song by The Velvet Underground (1967)
 "There She Goes Again" (Marshall Crenshaw song) (1982)